Soya3D is a high-level Python module for creating 3D video games.  Soya is free software, licensed under the GPL.  As a multi-platform game engine, it is known to run under Linux, Mac OS X, and Microsoft Windows.

Creator Jean-Baptiste "Jiba" Lamy describes Soya as a game engine focused on rapid development and ease of use.  Its goal is to enable amateur developers to create sophisticated 3D games entirely in the Python language.

Features and implementation
Soya3D aims to provide all that is needed to support a modern 3D game.  Rendering, sound, input, physical simulation, and networking are all provided via simple Python interfaces.  Soya is provided with a detailed - though incomplete - user guide which describes its architecture, operation, and interfaces.  Also included are over sixty tutorial scripts which provide working examples of the engine's features.

Computationally demanding components of Soya are written with Pyrex, which helps it to stay competitive in performance against more conventional game engines.  The engine also relies heavily upon open-source libraries such as Cal3D, OpenAL, ODE, among others.

Version history
Soya was originally a Java 3D game system called Opale.Soya.

 2003: The authors of Opale.Soya rewrote it in Python and C
 2003: Opale.Soya renamed Soya3d with its version 0.3 release
 July 12, 2004: Version 0.7 released as a complete rewrite in Pyrex
 October 16, 2004: Version 0.8.1 release added Open Dynamics Engine support
 December 12, 2004: Version 0.9 released added support for Microsoft Windows and Mac OS X exporters for 3D Studio Max and Maya.
 July 9, 2005: Version 0.10, released including a new widget system called Pudding and support for Cal3d 0.10 (Soya previously used Cal3D 0.9.2)
 June 11, 2006: Version 0.11 This release allows to use Cerealizer instead of cPickle (see on website for more information)
 July 19, 2006: Version 0.12 This new version proposes a new sound API, a new automatic system for optimizing static object
 January 24, 2007: Version 0.13 ODE integration, Blender exporter, BSP system (work in progress), bugfixes
 August 8, 2008: Version 0.14
 January 24, 2010: Version 0.15rc1 
 September 6, 2014: Version 3–0.1 – Support for Python 3.4 and Blender 2.70, vertex shaders and pixel shaders, improved performance (the rendering process has been entirely rewritten using vertex buffer object), fullscreen anti-aliasing, per-pixel lighting and cellshading, GPL v3 license

PySoy
In June 2006, due to dissatisfaction with Lamy's leadership approach and technical decisions, some developers launched a fork of Soya3D called PySoy.  The project promises a more inclusive, community-oriented development environment.

PySoy Beta-2 was released in January 2008  and development remains active with further releases.

See also

References

External links
 Current Soya3D Home Page
 Old Soya3D Home Page
 PySoy Homepage

Python (programming language) libraries
Free 3D graphics software
Free software programmed in Python